While She Sleeps are  a British metalcore  band from Sheffield. Formed in 2006, the group consists of vocalist Lawrence Taylor, guitarists Sean Long and Mat Welsh, bassist Aaran McKenzie and drummer Adam Savage. They are currently signed to their own label Sleeps Brothers in the UK and in collaboration with Spinefarm Records in the US and UNFD in Australia. They have released three EPs, And This Is Just the Start, Split and The North Stands for Nothing, and five studio albums, This Is the Six, Brainwashed, You Are We, So What? and Sleeps Society. They received the Best British Newcomer award at the Kerrang! Awards 2012. The group has maintained the same line-up since its formation, with vocalist Taylor being the only bandmate who is not an original member. Despite this, he has still appeared on every release apart from the group's first two EPs.

History

Formation, first releases and The North Stands for Nothing (2006–2011)
While She Sleeps was formed in Renishaw, near Sheffield, England, in 2006 by vocalist Jordan Widdowson, drummer Adam Savage, bassist Aaran McKenzie and guitarists Mat Welsh and Sean Long. The group had played together in several bands prior to forming While She Sleeps and are described as being "best mates since school". In 2006, they released their first EP, And This Is Just the Start. This EP, however, was not released on a label. After a handful of live shows, in 2009 the majority of the group decided to focus on the band "full time". In March 2009, the band released a split EP with the band Andwhitestars through James Records limited to 100 copies. After this, vocalist Widdowson decided to leave the band due to work commitments. With the addition of vocalist Lawrence Taylor the band began working on material for their third EP in a home studio. From late 2009 through to 2010 the band toured heavily throughout the UK and eventually in to Europe. With growing public interest, the band finished work on The North Stands for Nothing which was released on 26 July 2010, through Small Town Records. The band held an album launch show on 24 June at The Plug in their hometown and followed its release with extensive touring throughout 2010, including an appearance at Sonisphere Festival. In October, they signed a deal with Good Fight Music to distribute their music in the United States.

Following the release of their mini-album – backed by their extensive touring – the band's popularity continued to increase and interest from media and labels grew. On 15 February 2011, the band recorded a live in session performance at Maida Vale Studios for BBC Radio 1. They also began to work on new material between touring, releasing the non-album single "Be(lie)ve" through Good Fight Music on 15 March 2011. On 4 May, While She Sleeps were invited to open for Bring Me the Horizon in Sheffield at the O2 Academy. In the summer, they performed at several festivals throughout Europe and supported Bring Me the Horizon for two shows in Ireland at the end of August. While She Sleeps were invited to tour the US with Bring Me the Horizon in August through to October. However, While She Sleeps had to cancel their dates in the US, citing problems with immigration. In October, the band went on their first headline tour through the UK and Europe, with support from Bury Tomorrow and Feed the Rhino.

This Is the Six (2012–2014)

On 1 November 2011, While She Sleeps began working on their debut album with producer Carl Bown. First working in Chapel Studios in Lincolnshire, England, to record drums before moving to Treehouse Studios in Chesterfield, England, to record the rest of the album. After recording had finished, the band toured the UK in February 2012 as part of the Kerrang! Tour alongside New Found Glory, The Blackout, and Letlive. It was announced on 27 March, that While She Sleeps had signed with Search and Destroy Records to release their début album. On 4 April, Kerrang! magazine revealed that the upcoming album This Is the Six will be released on 6 August 2012 however the release date was later changed to 13 August. The title track "This Is the Six" was released as the first single from the album on 13 May. While She Sleeps are scheduled to appear at festivals and shows throughout the UK and Europe in the summer, including their first appearance at Download Festival. Followed by their first tour of Australia as direct support for House vs Hurricane, in late July and early August. On 7 June 2012, While She Sleeps won an award for Best British Newcomer at the Kerrang! Awards 2012.

Following the success of their debut album, This Is the Six, released 13 August 2012, While She Sleeps embarked on a full 9 date headline UK tour during September with support from Polar, Crossfaith and Bleed from Within. The band then embarked on a European Tour in the Fall, supporting Architects alongside Heights. While She Sleeps then joined Motionless in White and Betraying the Martyrs to support Asking Alexandria in their UK and European Tour. The band also played the Soundwave Festival across Australia during 2013. The band supported Parkway Drive across America and Canada during spring 2013. The band, following this, embarked on a short headline run of the UK when returning from the Parkway Drive tour. While She Sleeps were also confirmed on 4 January 2013 to be playing the entire length of Vans Warped Tour in America and Canada.

Taylor's throat surgery and Brainwashed (2014–2016)

During Warped Tour, they confirmed they had started to write their second full-length studio album. The latter part of 2013 saw vocalist Taylor suffer from vocal problems, leading to the band cancelling shows into 2014 in order for him to undergo throat surgery and recovery.

While She Sleeps announced a release for their second full-length studio album, Brainwashed on 23 March 2015. To support the album, the band embarked on a co-headline tour with Cancer Bats in April 2015, while also playing 2015's Warped Tour.

You Are We (2016–2018)
In early 2016, the band mentioned that they had begun writing for their third studio album. On 29 July, they announced that recording for the album had begun in their recently built studio.

On 4 September, they revealed the first single, titled "Civil Isolation", and on 12 September launched pre-orders and a PledgeMusic campaign for the album. Also on 12 September they parted ways with their record label. The second single, "Hurricane", was released on 20 November, alongside an announcement that the album will be titled You Are We and released on 21 April 2017. The same day the band announce their signing to Australian independent label UNFD.

On 20 January 2017, the band released the third single and title track "You Are We". On 23 February, they released a song titled "Silence Speaks" featuring Oliver Sykes, vocalist of Bring Me the Horizon. In April 2017, the group embarked on a month long tour of the United Kingdom and Ireland. On 17 April, four days before the album release, the band released the fifth single "Feel". On 2 May 2018, the band announced the deluxe edition of You Are We set for release on 20 July 2018, featuring unheard material, demos and live tracks from their September 2017 stripped down show at St. Pancras Church.

So What? (2018–2020)
On 7 June 2018, the band confirmed via social media that they were in the process of writing a new album. Production on the record was completed in October 2018. In an interview with Metal Hammer, guitarist Sean Long stated "I think people know the name While She Sleeps, but they don't have a real idea of what sort of band we are. That makes me really proud, and we are aiming to surprise people again." On 26 October, the band posted an image of an individual in a white hazmat suit and gas mask across their social media. The figure held a flash drive, which the posts said contained new music from the band, and could be retrieved from these figures at numerous locations in England.

The song on the drive was a snippet of the first single, "Anti-Social", which premiered on 28 October on Daniel P. Carter's BBC Radio 1's Rock Show. On the music video for "Anti-Social", the band announced So What? as the title for their fourth studio album. It is scheduled to be released 1 March 2019 through Sleeps Brothers, their own label, and in collaboration with Spinefarm Records. The band said that they wanted total creative control and so chose to self-release and partner up with a label. UK and European tour dates in February 2019 were announced in support of the album as well as the support acts, Stray from the Path, Trash Boat and LANDMVRKS. On 21 December, the band released the single "Haunt Me" and its corresponding music video, directed by bassist Aaron Mackenzie. Three weeks later, it was announced that the band would be supporting Architects on the North American leg of their "Holy Hell" headlining tour, along with Thy Art Is Murder.

On 30 January 2019, the band released the third single from the album "The Guilty Party". On 18 February, the band released a behind-the-scenes documentary from filmmaker Roscoe Neil, detailing the album's recording process and some difficulties the band faced leading up to the album's release. On 24 February, five days before album release, the band released the fourth single "Elephant". On 6 December, the band released a new single, "Fakers Plague" and its corresponding music video. The band released it along with a special phone-sized prism that let the viewers watch the video as a hologram projected from viewers' device.

Sleeps Society (2020–present)
On 15 October 2020, the band released the first single and title track "Sleeps Society" along with an accompanying music video. That same day, the band announced that their fifth studio album Sleeps Society would be released on 16 April 2021. They also revealed the album cover and unveiled their new members subscription service called Sleeps Society via the Patreon platform. Through the service, fans can contribute and subscribe with monthly donations to the band, and in turn contributors will have access to exclusive perks such as merchandise, secret shows, early access to tickets, podcasts, play throughs, tips, and more.

On 7 February 2021, the band released the second single "You Are All You Need", which debuted on Daniel P. Carter's BBC Radio 1's Rock Show. At the same time, the band revealed the official track list of the album. Guitarist Sean Long commented about the track: "We somehow managed to inject enough personal inspiration from each member for it to completely embody 'the Sleeps sound' with ease." On 18 March, one month before the album release, the band released the third single "Nervous" featuring Simon Neil of Biffy Clyro and its corresponding music video. On 19 April, the band shared that the album Sleeps Society would not be able to officially chart as they chose to sacrifice this to be able to keep paying their touring crew. On 14 April 2022, the band released the fourth single "Eye to Eye" while also announcing the deluxe edition of the album which was released on 3 June. At the same time, the band officially revealed the album cover and the track list, which included the previously released single "Fakers Plague".

Musical style and influences
While She Sleeps' musical style has often been described as metallic hardcore (hardcore punk-leaning metalcore) by reviewers. They have cited Thrice, Slipknot, Foo Fighters, Underoath, Refused, Comeback Kid, Gallows and Alexisonfire as musical influences. The band's sound typically features heavily down-tuned guitars, thick bass tones, screamed vocals and fast-paced drumming – occasionally complemented by melodic guitar tones and piano interludes. When questioned about the progression between their second EP The North Stands for Nothing and their 2012 studio album This Is the Six, guitarist Welsh said that they have not changed their sound drastically, saying "it's super heavy but then it's melodic too".

Band name
In an EMP interview in 2013, the singer Taylor explained that the name of the band originated from a magazine with a story of a woman murdering her husband while he slept, and changed it to "she" instead of "he." 
Taylor also explained that he likes to view the name as a reference to a vehicle or a ship sunken in the bottom of the sea, as ships and other vehicles are often referred with the feminine pronoun.

Members

Current
 Sean Long – lead guitar, backing vocals (2006–present)
 Aaran McKenzie – bass, backing vocals (2006–present)
 Adam "Sav" Savage – drums, percussion (2006–present)
 Mat Welsh – rhythm guitar, piano, vocals (2006–present) 
 Lawrence "Loz" Taylor – lead vocals (2009–present)

Former
 Jordan Widdowson – lead vocals (2006–2009)

Discography
Studio albums
 This Is the Six (2012)
 Brainwashed (2015)
 You Are We (2017)
 So What? (2019)
 Sleeps Society (2021)

EPs
 And This Is Just the Start (2006)
 Split (2009)
 The North Stands for Nothing (2010)

Videography

Music videos

Documentary
The band released a documentary called 20 Days of Sleeps directed by Tom Welsh.

The band released a documentary called So What? The Documentary directed by Roscoe Neil.

Awards
Kerrang! Awards

|-
| 2012 || While She Sleeps || Best British Newcomer || 
|}

Heavy Music Awards

|-
| 2018 || You Are We|| Best Album  || 
|}

References

External links

 

English metalcore musical groups
Musical groups from Sheffield
2006 establishments in England
Musical groups established in 2006
Kerrang! Awards winners
Musical quintets
Arising Empire artists